Knyaz Konstantin may refer to one of the following:

Knyaz Konstantin of Murom (? - 1129), the son of knyaz Sviatoslav II of Kiev.
Knyaz Konstantin of Russia (Konstantin Vsevolodovich) (1186 - 1218), the son of knyaz Vsevolod the Big Nest.
Knyaz Konstantin Ivanovich Ostrozhskiy, also known as Konstanty Ostrogski, (1463 - 1533) who was a Hetman of Lithuania.
Knyaz Konstantin Konstantinovich Ostrozhskiy (? - 1608), the son of the above Knyaz Konstantin Ivanovich Ostrozhskiy.
To be continued.